FC Felcsút is a Hungarian football team based in the village of Felcsút. They play in the league NB II of the Western Group.

References 

Football clubs in Hungary
2007 establishments in Hungary